The Benjamin Smith House is a historic home located at New Bern, Craven County, North Carolina.  It was built about 1790, and is a -story, brick side-hall plan dwelling with Georgian and Federal-style design elements.

It was listed on the National Register of Historic Places in 1972.

References

Houses on the National Register of Historic Places in North Carolina
Georgian architecture in North Carolina
Federal architecture in North Carolina
Houses completed in 1790
Houses in New Bern, North Carolina
National Register of Historic Places in Craven County, North Carolina